Sister Dolores Kane, R.H.S.J., R.N., M.Ed., is director of St. Bernard's School of Nursing in Chicago. A native of Chicago, she graduated magna cum laude from Loyola University, Chicago.

She previously worked in nursing at the former Macdonell Memorial Hospital (1975–86) and at St. Joseph's Villa (1975–78), both in Ontario, Canada.

Writings
Kane, Sister Dolores. Caring People Helping People: The Religious Hospitallers of St. Joseph of Cornwall 1897-1997. Cornwall: RHSJ Health Centre of Cornwall, 1996.  (in English)
Kane, Sister Dolores. Compatir pour mieux servir: Les Religieuses Hospitalières de St-Joseph de Cornwall 1897-1997. Translated by Soeur Bertille Beaulieu. Cornwall: RHSJ Health Centre of Cornwall, 1996.  (in French)

Legacy
 Kane House (3rd Floor East), St. Joseph's Continuing Care Centre, Cornwall, Ontario, Canada

External links
Catholic Health Alliance of Canada
Margaret M. Allemang Centre for Nursing History
Biodata (cache version)
The History of St. Joseph's School of Nursing
St. Joseph's Continuing Care Centre, "Brick By Brick" (September 2007)

Year of birth missing (living people)
Living people
Loyola University Chicago alumni
American expatriates in Canada
American nurses
American women nurses
American nursing administrators
20th-century American Roman Catholic nuns
People from Chicago
Catholics from Illinois
21st-century American Roman Catholic nuns